Monument of Liberty may refer to:

 Monument of Liberty, Rousse, Bulgaria
 Monument of Liberty, Istanbul, Turkey
 Monument of Liberty, Chişinău, Moldova

See also
Liberty Monument (disambiguation)
Statue of Liberty (disambiguation)
Freedom Monument (disambiguation)
Statue of Freedom